Doug Elliott is a storyteller, herbalist and naturalist whose specialty is the American Appalachians.  He is the author of several books featuring his own illustrations.  His recordings and writings take much from the Native American mythology and world view.

In addition, Elliott is an expert on basket weaving and other primitive skills.

Discography
Raccoon and a Possum (1997)
Bullfrogs on Your Mind (1997)
Stories, Songs, Jokes & Tales
Groundhogology
Crawdads, Doodlebugs & Creasy Greens
Looking for America
Everybody's Fishin''' (2003)Bound for Carolina: A Musical Journey Celebrating the Plants, Animals and People of the SoutheastSail On Honeybee: Adventures in Bee YardBibliographySwarm Tree: Of Honeybees, Honeymoons and the Tree of Life (2009)Wild Roots: A Forager's Guide to the Edible and Medicinal Roots, Tubers, Corms, and Rhizomes of North America (1995)Crawdads, Doodlebugs & Creasy Greens: Songs, Stories & Lore Celebrating the Natural World (1995)Wildwoods Wisdom: Encounters with the Natural World (1992)Woodslore and Wildwoods Wisdom: Stories, Myth, Folklore and Truth Stranger Than Fiction About the Natural World (1986)ROOTS: An Underground Botany and Forager's Guide'' (1976)

External links
Official Website

American naturalists
American male writers
Living people
American storytellers
Basket weavers
Herbalists
Year of birth missing (living people)